Smoke Rise is an upscale residential community in DeKalb County, Georgia, United States, located northeast of Atlanta in the City of Tucker, incorporated in 2016. It is located north of the city of Stone Mountain on the Eastern side of the city of Tucker. The main road through Smoke Rise is Hugh Howell Road (Georgia Route 236). Smoke Rise is a part of the city of Tucker, and is near the Gwinnett-DeKalb county line. The local public schools are Smoke Rise Elementary School, Tucker Middle School and Tucker High School.

Local History

Native American families certainly made campsites in this area as early as 12,000 years ago. These earliest inhabitants seem to have been nomadic in habit, traveling in groups which followed the migration patterns of game animals.

A neighborhood landmark, Stone Mountain, received its first mention in print about 1600. A Spanish explorer told the tales he heard about a mountain in Georgia, "very high, shining when the sun set like a fire." Within the next hundred years the area around the mountain was criss-crossed with trading paths which connected native settlements with the Atlantic coast and the Chattahoochee River. Many of those trails are now local highways with evocative names such as Rockbridge, which refers to an easy natural crossing site on the Yellow River. The only undisturbed path from the years of Native American inhabitation here is the footpath which goes up the west slope of Stone Mountain. Humans have taken that route for centuries and do so daily even today.

The Cherokee Nation occupied the northern part of Georgia by the 17th century. This area was part of a vast woodland reserved for hunting by both Cherokees and their southern neighbors, the Muscogee tribes. European settlers soon began filtering up from the settled areas of the coast. Though treaties and federal policy protected the Cherokee and Muscogee claims to their land, various strategies were employed by the state of Georgia to open large tracts of land to white settlement. The area lay in a parcel which was ceded to the State of Georgia by the Muscogee in 1821.

In December 1822, DeKalb County was incorporated from that land. The county was named for Johann de Kalb, a Prussian general who died fighting for the United States during the Revolution. The county seat, placed at the intersection of two great Native American trading paths, was named after the naval hero Stephen Decatur. The county itself was settled by a novel method designed to discourage land speculation. The new county was surveyed and divided into  lots. They were given out in a lottery for deserving veterans and other eligible citizens of Georgia. The early settlers of DeKalb tended to be farmers, mainly Scots, Irish and English families. They grew corn, cleared their own land, built sawmills and grist mills and rarely owned slaves. Their names are still found on local maps, attached to roads which wind through former fields: Rosser, McCurdy. These yeoman families gave DeKalb its first justices of the peace, doctors and ministers, as well as its soldiers in the Civil War. Armies of the North and South swept through this area in the summer of 1864 during the days of the Battle of Atlanta, fighting over the railroad lines going to the city.

After the war, the area was farmed again and the primary crop tended to be cotton. Extensive terracing on slopes in the neighborhood show where farmers a hundred years ago struggled to grow cotton on the hilly terrain. The town of Tucker began to grow where farm roads crossed the new Seaboard line. The village of Stone Mountain clustered around the extensive quarrying operations there. There are few traces in the neighborhood of these late 19th century developments, though anecdote suggests that a blacksmith's shop once stood on Silver Hill Road, near a one-room schoolhouse. The oldest home in the neighborhood, barely visible from Silver Hill, is a cottage built for the school marm. Silver Hill, one of the oldest roads in the neighborhood, makes its first appearance on a 1915 map of DeKalb County. It was a dirt road then and remained so until the late 1960s.

Cotton farming became even more of an uphill struggle with the onset of the cotton boll weevil. During the Depression, farmers left their fields for opportunities elsewhere. Several of the farms which were in the area were purchased in the late 1930s by an Atlanta attorney named Hugh Howell. The tract of land he assembled near Stone Mountain seems to have been intended for hunting and entertaining purposes. He built a country house with access to the road that would become the Stone Mountain Freeway. The road that bears his name was a later addition, a dirt track which connected Lawrenceville Highway and the village by the mountain.

Howell decided to sell his acreage for development in the late 1950s. He insisted that land be set aside for a new school, which is now Smoke Rise Elementary. An early subdivision attracted pioneer families for whom a call to Atlanta rang up a long distance charge. A single postman in a pickup truck delivered mail and the only building between the neighborhood and Tucker was the DuPont plant (which has since been replaced by the Publix shopping center). Hunting hounds whooped through the fields in autumn and a search party was once organized to find a child lost in the deep woods off Rosser Road.

The Smoke Rise name was coined by developer Bill Probst, who is responsible for many of the first homes built in the next phase of development, Smoke Rise, during the 1960s. Neighborhoods began to form up and down Hugh Howell as land changed hands. The McCurdy family's farm and hunting fields became the Forest, for example; the family name remained on the road which led through the property.

Unincorporated communities in DeKalb County, Georgia
Unincorporated communities in Georgia (U.S. state)